Walter Roy Fountain (16 February 1915 – 13 April 1995) was an Australian rules footballer who played with St Kilda in the Victorian Football League (VFL). Fountain played as a ruckman and was St Kilda's best and fairest winner in 1939.

References

External links

1915 births
1995 deaths
Trevor Barker Award winners
Australian rules footballers from Victoria (Australia)
St Kilda Football Club players
Moorabbin Football Club players